A retro style automobile is a vehicle that is styled to appear like cars from previous decades. Often these cars use modern technology and production techniques.

List of retro-styled automobiles

Production cars

 1964 Excalibur (automobile) – 1928 Mercedes-Benz SSK
 1972 Panther J72 – SS Jaguar 100
 1974 MP Lafer – 1952 MG TD Midget
 1974 Panther De Ville
 1974 Panther FF
 1976 Panther Lima
 1980 Cadillac Seville – bustle-back styling from the 1930s-1960s
 1980 Phillips Berlina – Mercedes-Benz 540K
 1981 Imperial – bustle-back styling from the 1930s-1960s
 1982 Lincoln Continental – bustle-back styling from the 1930s-1960s
 1982 Panther Kallista
 1983 Evante – Lotus Elan
 1983 Eniak Antique
 1987 Nissan Be-1 – the original Mini
 1989 Nissan Pao – the original Mini
 1989 Nissan S-Cargo – 1948 Citroën 2CV and Snails
 1991 Nissan Figaro – possibly the 1958 Austin-Healey Sprite, but more likely the 1959 Datsun Sports 1000
 1992 Subaru Vivio Bistro – the original Mini
 1993 Mitsuoka Viewt – 1963 Jaguar Mark 2
 1993 Wiesmann MF 30 – Jaguar XK140
 1994 Nissan Rasheen - unknown, but often compared to the Wartburg 353
 1996 Mitsuoka Galue
 1996 Toyota Classic – Toyota AA
 1997 Plymouth Prowler – 1930s hot rod
 1998 Rover 75 - 1950s Rover P4
 1998 Honda Z – Honda N360
 1998 Volkswagen New Beetle – 1938 Volkswagen Type 1 "Beetle"
 1999 Daihatsu Mira Gino – Mini
 2000 BMW Z8 – 1956 BMW 507
 2000 Jaguar S-Type – 1960s Jaguar S-Type
 2000 Toyota Origin – 1955 Toyota Crown
 2001 MINI – 1959 BMC Mini
 2001 Morgan Aero 8
 2001 Chrysler PT Cruiser – Chevrolet Advance Design and Chrysler Airflow
 2001 Devaux Coupe
 2002 Ford Thunderbird – 1955–1957 Ford Thunderbird
 2002 Hummer H2 – Humvee
 2002 Suzuki Lapin
 2004 Chrysler Crossfire
 2004 Ford GT – 1964 Ford GT40
 2004 Morgan Roadster
 2005 Ford Mustang – 1965 Ford Mustang
 2006 Chevrolet HHR – 1940s Chevrolet Suburban
2006 Hummer H3 –  Humvee 
 2007 Fiat 500 – 1957 Fiat 500
2007 Ruf CTR3 – 1950s and 1960s LeMans race cars 
 2007 Toyota FJ Cruiser – 1960 Toyota FJ40 Land Cruiser
 2008 Dodge Challenger – 1970 Dodge Challenger
 2009 AC MK VI – 1963 AC Cobra
 2009 Daihatsu Mira Cocoa
 2010 Chevrolet Camaro – 1967 Chevrolet Camaro
 2010 Mercedes-Benz SLS AMG – Mercedes-Benz 300 SL
 2010 Mitsuoka Himiko – Jaguar XK120 and others
 2011 Volkswagen Beetle – 1938 Volkswagen Type 1 "Beetle"
 2012 Morgan 3-Wheeler
 2012 Toyota 86-Toyota 2000GT 
 2014 Hongqi L5 – Hongqi CA770
 2014 Equus Bass 770
 2016 Fiat 124 Spider – Fiat 124 Sport Spider
 2016 Daihatsu Move Canbus
 2017 Alpine A110 – Alpine A110
 2018 Ruf SCR 2018 – Ruf SCR and Porsche 964
 2018 Toyota Century – Toyota Century (G20/G30/G40)
 2018 Daihatsu Mira Tocot
 2019 Ares Design Progettouno – De Tomaso Pantera
 2020 Honda e – 1972 Honda Civic
 2020 Fiat 500e - 1957 Fiat 500
 2021 Ford Bronco – 1966 Ford Bronco
 2021 Hyundai Ioniq 5 – 1975 Hyundai Pony
 2021 Morris Commercial JE – 1949 Morris Commercial J-type
 2022 Volkswagen ID. Buzz - 1950 Volkswagen Type 2
 2022 Lamborghini Countach LPI 800-4 - 1974 Lamborghini Countach
 2023 Nissan Z (RZ34) - 1969 Nissan Fairlady Z

Concept cars
 1993 Bugatti EB 112 – Bugatti Type 57
 1995 Chrysler Atlantic – 1930s Bugatti Type 57 and Talbot-Lago T150 SS
 1998 Chrysler Chronos – 1953 Chrysler D'Elegance concept
 1997 Plymouth Pronto
 1998 Bugatti EB 118 – Bugatti Type 50 and Type 57
 1999 Bugatti EB 218 – Bugatti Type 101
 1999 Dodge Charger R/T – 1960s Dodge Charger
 1999 Plymouth Howler
 2000 Audi Rosemeyer – 1936 Auto Union Type C racing car
 2001 Buick Blackhawk – 1938 Buick Y-Job concept
 2001 Ford Forty-Nine – 1949 Ford
 2001 Volkswagen Microbus Concept – 1950 Volkswagen Type 2
 2004 Fiat Trepiùno – Fiat 500
 2005 Holden Efijy – Holden FJ
 2005 Volvo T6 – 1930s hot rod
 2006 Lamborghini Concept M – 1966 Lamborghini Miura
 2008 Scion Hako Coupe
 2009 Bugatti 16C Galibier – Bugatti Type 57
 2009 Morgan LIFEcar
 2010 Morgan Eva GT
 2011 Citroën Tubik – Citroën Type H
 2013 Nissan IDx – 1968 Datsun 510
 2015 Toyota Tacoma Back to the Future Concept - 1985 Toyota pickup
 2017 Volkswagen I.D. Buzz – 1950 Volkswagen Type 2
 2021 Hyundai Grandeur Heritage – 1986 Hyundai Grandeur
 2021 Renault 5 EV Prototype - 1974 Renault 5
 2022 Hyundai N Vision 74 - 1974 Hyundai Pony Coupe concept

See also 
 Retro style

References